Magid Mayanja Kagimu (born c. 1954) is a Ugandan physician, academic and community leader, who serves as Professor of Medicine and Head of the Gastroenterology Division at Makerere University College of Health Sciences, in Kampala, Uganda's capital and largest city.

Background and education
Kagimu was born in Buganda circa 1954. He attended local elementary schools. He studied at Kings College Budo for his high school education.

He was admitted to Makerere University Medical School, the oldest school of medicine in East Africa, in 1974. He graduated in 1979 with a Bachelor of Medicine and Bachelor of Surgery (MBChB) degree.

Following a year of internship, and another as a medical officer, he returned to Makerere to pursue a Master of Medicine in Internal Medicine, graduating in 1983. His chosen specialty is gastroenterology.

In 2017, he was elected as a Fellow of the Royal College of Physicians.

Career
For a period spanning over 30 years, Kagimu has served as lecturer, senior lecturer, associate professor and full professor in the division of gastroenterology, department of medicine, at Makerere University College of Health Sciences. He concurrently serves as a Senior Consultant gastroenterologist at Mulago National Referral Hospital, the teaching hospital of the medical college.

He is a member of the gastroenterology team that cared for Joyce Moriku, the State Minister of Health for Primary Care, in the Cabinet of Uganda, when she fell ill in November 2017.

Other roles
Kagimu serves as the chairman of the Islamic Medical Association of Uganda (IMAU). He also serves as the Secretariat Administrator of the Uganda Gastroenterology Society.

In 2016, when the Embassy of Sweden in Uganda launched a campaign to recognize the critical role that midwives play in Ugandan society, Kagimu was selected by the embassy as one of seven Champions of the Midwives4all campaign. The role of the champions was to mobilize communities, influence policy-makers and encourage young people to consider training as midwives.

References

External links
Partial list of Kagimu's publications

Ugandan gastroenterologists
Living people
Ganda people
1954 births
Ugandan Muslims
Makerere University alumni
People from Central Region, Uganda
People educated at King's College Budo
Fellows of the Royal College of Physicians